Dymaxion may refer to:
Dymaxion map, a map projection that minimizes distortion of landmasses

Dymaxion, a term coined by Buckminster Fuller to describe his work
Dymaxion car
Dymaxion house
Dymaxion Chronofile
Dymaxion deployment unit
The Last Dymaxion, a 2012 documentary film